"Ars Poetica", or "The Art of Poetry", is a poem written by Horace c. 19 BC, in which he advises poets on the art of writing poetry and drama. The Ars Poetica has "exercised a great influence in later ages on European literature, notably on French drama" and has inspired poets and authors since it was written. Although it has been well-known since the Middle Ages, it has been used in literary criticism since the Renaissance.

Background 
The poem was written in hexameter verse as an Epistle (or Letter) to Lucius Calpurnius Piso (the Roman senator and consul) and his two sons, and is sometimes referred to as the Epistula ad Pisones, or "Epistle to the Pisos". The first mention of its name as the "Ars Poetica" was c. 95 by the classical literary critic Quintilian in his Institutio Oratoria, and since then it has been known by that name. The translations of the original epistle are typically in the form of prose.

"Written, like Horace's other epistles of this period, in a loose conversational frame, Ars Poetica consists of 476 lines containing nearly 30 maxims for young poets."   But Ars Poetica is not a systematic treatise of theory, and it wasn't intended to be. It is an inviting and lively poetic letter, composed for friends who appreciate poetic literature.

Horace approaches poetry from a practical standpoint—as a craft, or ars—rather than the theoretical approach of his predecessors, Aristotle and the philosopher Plato. He also holds the poet in high regard, as opposed, for instance, to Plato, who distrusts mimesis and who has philosopher Socrates say in Book 10 of the Republic that he would banish poets from the ideal state.

Summary 
The following is a brief outline of the main subjects of the work:

(For a more detailed summary of Horace's Ars Poetica, see the article on Horace's Epistles – Epistle II.3).

Literary phrases 
"Many of...[the] apt phrases [of the Ars Poetica]...have passed into common literary parlance."  Four quotations in particular are associated with the work:

 "in medias res (l. 148)", or "into the middle of things". This describes a narrative technique of starting the story from its middle point. According to Horace, this entices the audience into the plot by making everyone curious about the characters' previous paths and their future destinies. The technique appeared frequently in ancient epics, and remains popular in modern narratives.
 "ab ovo (l. 147)", or "from the beginning". As Homer did not initiate his epics about the Trojan War from the conception (thus, the egg – "ovo" in Latin) of Helen, poets and other story tellers should do something likewise: in other words, starting a story from its commencement will bore and fatigue audiences that may not be interested in a plot that is tediously inclusive. For another explanation of this mention of an egg, see Leda (mythology).
 "quandoque bonus dormitat Homerus (l. 359)" or "sometimes even good Homer nods off". Today this expression is used to indicate that 1. even the most skilled poet can make continuity errors and 2. long works, usually epics (such as the Iliad or the Odyssey), may have their faults without that detracting significantly from their general quality. In context, however, Horace even censures Homer for such lapses. It reads "et idem | indignor quandoque bonus dormitat Homerus"; (I even castigate the good Homer for the same [fault of technical errors] whenever he nods off). 
 "ut pictura poesis (l. 361)", or "as is painting so is poetry", by which Horace meant that poetry, in its widest sense meaning "imaginative texts", merits the same careful interpretation that was in his day reserved for painting.

(The latter two phrases occur one after the other near the end of the poem).

Key concepts 
The work is also known for its discussion of the principle of decorum (the use of appropriate vocabulary and diction in each style of writing) (l.81–106), and for Horace's criticisms of purple prose (purpureus pannus, l.15–16), a term coined by him to mean the use of flowery language. This principle is considered a core component of Horatian poetics as it principally aimed to achieve verisimilitude in artistic representation, guiding everything from the choice of genre to diction, dramatic characterization, meter, poetic invention, and the intended effect. Some cited that decorum enforces subordination such as of parts to whole, woman to man, desire to reason, and individual to state.

In line 191, Horace warns against deus ex machina, the practice of resolving a convoluted plot by having an Olympian god appear and set things right. Horace writes "Nec deus intersit, nisi dignus vindice nodus": "That a god not intervene, unless a knot show up that be worthy of such an untangler".

Perhaps it can even be said that the quotability of Horace's Ars Poetica is what has given it a distinguished place in literary criticism: The Norton Anthology of Theory and Criticism says: 

The Horatian platitude is usually given as "instruct and delight", but sometimes as "instruct or delight".  The first reading implies that all literature must be instructive. A related ambiguity is that "instruct" might be better translated as "help", "advise", or "warn". Horace repeats this maxim in different wordings: "Aut prodesse uolunt aut delectare poetae aut simul et iucunda et idonea dicere uitae" (The poet wishes to benefit or please, or to be pleasant and helpful at the same time), "miscuit utile dulci" (a mix of useful and sweet), and "delectando pariterque monendo" (delighting and advising).

The Ars Poetica was first translated into English in 1566 by Thomas Drant. A translation by Ben Jonson was published posthumously in 1640.

See also 
 Epistles of Horace

References

External links 

 Latin text of poem at The Latin Library
 Text at Perseus.
 (English translation)

Literature about poetry
Literary concepts
Poetry by Horace
1st-century BC Latin books